32 Vulpeculae is a single star located around 610 light years away from the Sun in the northern constellation Vulpecula, a few degrees south of the border with Cygnus. It is visible to the naked eye as a faint, orange-hued star with a typical apparent visual magnitude of 5.03. This object is drifting further away from the Earth with a heliocentric radial velocity of +6 km/s.

This is an aging red giant star with a stellar classification of K4 III, having exhausted the supply of hydrogen at its core then expanded to 54 times the Sun's radius. It is a suspected variable of unknown type, with a visual magnitude that has been measured ranging from 4.99 down to 5.06. The star is radiating 708 times the luminosity of the Sun from its enlarged photosphere at an effective temperature of 4,041 K.

References

K-type giants
Suspected variables

Vulpecula
Durchmusterung objects
Vulpeculae, 32
199169
103200
8008